Billy the Kid is a Lucky Luke comic book written by Goscinny and illustrated by Morris. It is the twentieth title in the original series. The original French-language version was printed in 1962 by Dupuis. It is the first in the English versions published by Cinebook Ltd.

Plot
In 1878, the town of Fort Weakling is "terrorized" by the notorious criminal Billy the Kid - or, more accurately, the citizens cower in fear of the things Billy, a bullying type, could supposedly do to them. Lucky Luke arrives at Fort Weakling, surprised at the deserted streets and the overly nervous welcome by the local hotel manager. He meets Billy, who finds him funny and invites him to drink hot chocolate in the saloon. As a result of a 'joke' of Billy's, Luke crushes a cake on his face. Billy finds it funny. When he learns that Luke has stood up to Billy, Josh Belly, the editor of the local newspaper and the only man in town determined to see Billy jailed, has Luke made assistant sheriff.

However, the fight against the bandit is more difficult than expected. Billy's victims are so terrified that they refuse to testify against him. Luke manages to find a local citizen to testify against him - Foster Rawson, the grocer, from whom Billy regularly red caramels - but Rawson attempts to flee the town to not have to testify. Lucky Luke retrieves him, but at the trial itself the members of the jury refuse to convict Billy, who leaves the court to the applause of the judge, the witness and the jury.

After these failed attempts, Lucky Luke decides to teach the people that desperados are not as bad as they pretend to be. With the help of Belly, he pretends to turn into a desperado and begins to terrorize the town, including with a staged stagecoach attack and a bank robbery. Citizens start demonstrating for Billy the Kid to defend them against Lucky Luke. Completely taken aback, Billy proposes an alliance with Luke, who rejects it with contempt. A duel is organized between the two in the main street, but the support of the population for Billy makes him break down, and Luke captures him. After some encouragement and recompensation by Luke and Belly, the citizens finally testify at Billy's trial, and Billy is sentenced to 1,247 years in prison.

Characters 

 Billy the Kid: Spoilt child with a turned-up nose and a freckled face; he only drinks hot chocolate and loves soft caramels. He will ultimately be sentenced to more than 1,200 years of forced labor. He will also appear as a main character in The Escort, and as a secondary character in The Black Hills (1963), Jesse James (1969) and Belle Starr (1995).
 Josh Belly: Director of The Clairon newspaper, he dares to resist Billy and allies with Lucky Luke.
 Mr. Bonney: Billy's father, who spanks him during his first diligence attack and deprives him of dessert; he adds that this deprivation will be applied to each new attack, which results in the departure of Billy.
 Kirk: Billy asks him to read the paper, but as he calls for mobilization against Billy, he prefers to invent a fairy tale.
 Sarah and Foster Rawson: Village grocers, suppliers of soft caramels for Billy, by whom they are terrorized.
 Sam: Saloon bartender, who only serves hot chocolate.
 Judge Yelloliver ("yellow liver"): He acquits Billy in his first trial, but when the latter, neutralized, appears a second time, he sentences him to 1,247 years of forced labor after nine seconds of deliberation.

Notes
The story's epilogue marks the first appearance of Jesse James in the series, before his eventual starring role in the 1969 album.
The story has resemblance to the cartoon short film Two Gun Goofy (1952).

References

 Morris publications in Spirou BDoubliées

External links
 Lucky Luke official site album index 
 Goscinny website on Lucky Luke

Comics by Morris (cartoonist)
Comics about Billy the Kid
Lucky Luke albums
1962 graphic novels
Works originally published in Spirou (magazine)
Works by René Goscinny
Fiction set in 1878
Cultural depictions of Jesse James